Bluetown-Iglesia Antigua was a census-designated place (CDP) in Cameron County, Texas, United States. The population was 692 at the 2000 census. For the 2010 census the area was split into two CDPs, Bluetown and Iglesia Antigua. The communities are part of the Brownsville–Harlingen Metropolitan Statistical Area.

Geography
The Bluetown-Iglesia Antigua CDP was located at  (26.075355, -97.824886).

Demographics
As of the census of 2000, there were 692 people, 163 households, and 149 families residing in the CDP. The population density was 136.1 people per square mile (52.5/km2). There were 179 housing units at an average density of 35.2/sq mi (13.6/km2). The racial makeup of the CDP was 84.54% White, 0.14% African American, 0.14% Asian, 13.73% from other races, and 1.45% from two or more races. Hispanic or Latino of any race were 93.79% of the population.

There were 163 households, out of which 55.2% had children under the age of 18 living with them, 72.4% were married couples living together, 15.3% had a female householder with no husband present, and 8.0% were non-families. 6.7% of all households were made up of individuals, and 4.9% had someone living alone who was 65 years of age or older. The average household size was 4.25 and the average family size was 4.44.

In the CDP, the population was spread out, with 35.4% under the age of 18, 12.6% from 18 to 24, 24.1% from 25 to 44, 17.3% from 45 to 64, and 10.5% who were 65 years of age or older. The median age was 26 years. For every 100 females, there were 91.7 males. For every 100 females age 18 and over, there were 91.0 males.

The median income for a household in the CDP was $16,957, and the median income for a family was $17,120. Males had a median income of $16,563 versus $14,500 for females. The per capita income for the CDP was $6,960. About 42.7% of families and 47.0% of the population were below the poverty line, including 55.9% of those under age 18 and 38.4% of those age 65 or over.

Education
Bluetown and Iglesia Antigua are served by the Santa Maria Independent School District.

In addition, South Texas Independent School District operates magnet schools that serve the community.

References

Census-designated places in Cameron County, Texas
Census-designated places in Texas